Richard Bryde also Byrde was one of the two MPs for Ipswich in the English parliaments for March 1553.

References

Byrde